Night of the Living Dead Boys is a 1981 live album by Dead Boys. It was recorded in March 1979 at CBGB. Since Stiv Bators purposely did not sing into the microphone at this show, the vocals were overdubbed later, causing mixed opinions on this album.

The album was released on CD in two editions, which are significantly different. The first edition, with the "glam" cover (illustrated in this article) had the original song order reshuffled, with poorly done fade-outs and fade-ins. This edition also came with a second section, a reunion show with (at least) Stiv Bators and Cheetah  Chrome present, from 1987. This edition also had extensive liner notes detailing Bators' trick of singing off-mike, and claims he re-recorded the entire album in one take, from memory, while drunk and in the booth with two groupies - in other words, typical Stiv.

The second CD issue of Night of the Living Dead Boys had the original album artwork - from the front anyway, though not the photo collage on the back - along with the original, unedited, uninterrupted song order. This edition is more "pure," containing only the original album, with no extra material, printed or auditory. While some may prefer the earlier issue with its reunion show and interesting reading, only this second version is true to the original.

Track listing
 "Detention Home" (Siv Bators, Cheetah Chrome) 	3:41
 "3rd Generation Nation" (Stiv Bators) 2:38
 "All This and More" (Jimmy Zero) 3:05
 "Caught with the Meat in Your Mouth" (Stiv Bators, Cheetah Chrome) 2:06
 "Tell Me" (Mick Jagger, Keith Richards) 2:36
 "Catholic Boy" (Stiv Bators)  	2:43
 "I Won't Look Back" (Jimmy Zero) 2:16
 "Ain't It Fun" (Peter Laughner, Cheetah Chrome) 4:31
 "What Love Is" (Stiv Bators, Cheetah Chrome) 	2:02
 "Ain't Nothin' to Do" (Stiv Bators, Cheetah Chrome) 2:27
 "I Need Lunch" (Stiv Bators, Jimmy Zero) 3:31
 "Son of Sam" (Jimmy Zero) 4:46
 "Sonic Reducer" (David Thomas, Jeff Magnum, Johnny Blitz) 2:46

Personnel
Dead Boys
Stiv Bators - vocals
Cheetah Chrome - guitar
Jimmy Zero - guitar
Jeff Magnum - bass
Johnny Blitz - drums

Dead Boys albums
1981 live albums
Albums recorded at CBGB